The John K. Fairbank Prize in East Asian History is offered annually for an outstanding book in the history of China proper, Vietnam, Chinese Central Asia, Mongolia, Manchuria, Korea, or Japan, substantially after 1800. It honors the late John K. Fairbank, Francis Lee Higginson Professor of History and director of the East Asian Research Center at Harvard University, and president of the American Historical Association in 1968. Only books of high scholarly and literary merit will be considered. Anthologies, edited works, and pamphlets are ineligible for the competition.

List of prizes

See also
Joseph Levenson Book Prize for Chinese history.
John Whitney Hall Book Prize for Japanese or Korean history.
James B. Palais Book Prize for Korean history.
List of history awards
List of prizes named after people

Notes

References

External links
 John K. Fairbank Prize WorldCat listing.

Historiography of China
Asian awards
Awards established in 1969
American Historical Association book prizes